Scrobipalpa bahai is a moth in the family Gelechiidae. It was described by Povolný in 1977. It is found in Afghanistan.

The forewings are covered with whitish, many or some greyish tipped, scales. There are three black stigmata and marginal dots. The hindwings are grey-whitish.

References

Scrobipalpa
Moths described in 1977
Taxa named by Dalibor Povolný